Anu Aun (born 14 February 1980 in Pärnu) is an Estonian film director, producer and scenarist.

2005-2007 she worked at television production company OÜ Filmimees. In 2005 she founded (with Priit Pääsuke and Margo Siimon) the production company Luxfilm.

Filmography

 2007 "Indigo tuba" (feature film; director and producer)
 2010 "Vahetus" (feature film; director and scenarist)
 2016 "Polaarpoiss" (feature film; director and scenarist)	
 2018 "Eia jõulud Tondikakul" (feature film; director and scenarist)

References

Living people
1980 births
Estonian film directors
Estonian screenwriters
Tallinn University alumni
People from Pärnu